Athens Airways was a Greek regional airline, headquartered in Koropi, Athens. The airline used to connect Alexandroupoli, Athens and Thessaloniki with some Greek islands, as well offering chartered flights. The airline was founded in 2008 and launched scheduled flights on 31 January 2009.

In late May 2010 the Greek Civil Aviation Authority stripped Athens Airways of the right to serve a number of government-subsidised routes. Thιs was due to unexplained delays and cancellations by Athens Airways. Later that year, by early September and after concluding its summer schedule, the airline ceased operations without any notice.

Services
Athens Airways was the first Greek airline to offer a 20 percent discount to all tariff categories for passengers aged 12 to 24, soldiers without boarding pass, and students up to the age of 28, as well as a 15 percent discount on return flights.

Destinations
Athens Airways served the following domestic Greek destinations (as of 17 June 2010):

Agios Kirykos - Ikaria Island National Airport
Alexandroupoli – Alexandroupolis International Airport Focus City
Argostoli - Kefalonia Island International Airport
Athens – Athens International Airport Hub
Chania – Chania International Airport
Fira – Santorini (Thira) National Airport
Heraklion - Heraklion International Airport, "Nikos Kazantzakis"
Karpathos - Karpathos Island National Airport
Kavala - Kavala Megas Alexandros International Airport
Kythira - Kithira Island National Airport
Mykonos - Mykonos Airport
Myrina - Lemnos International Airport
Mytilene – Mytilene International Airport Focus City
Rhodes – Rhodes International Airport, "Diagoras"
Skiathos – Skiathos Island National Airport
Thessaloniki – Thessaloniki International Airport, "Macedonia" Focus City
Zakynthos - Zakynthos International Airport, "Dionysios Solomos"

Fleet
The Athens Airways fleet included the following aircraft (as of September 2010):

References

External links
Official website
Official website 

Defunct airlines of Greece
Airlines established in 2008
Airlines disestablished in 2010
Greek companies established in 2008